Sahler Stone House is a historic home located at Rochester in Ulster County, New York.  The original block, dated to about 1750, is a two bay stone one story, one room structure.  Spreading out from it are later stone and frame additions.

It was listed on the National Register of Historic Places in 1999.

References

Houses on the National Register of Historic Places in New York (state)
Houses completed in 1750
Houses in Ulster County, New York
National Register of Historic Places in Ulster County, New York